The Kabyle myth is a colonial trope that was propagated by French colonists in the French Algeria based on a supposed binary between Arab and Kabyle, consisting of a set of stereotypes of supposed differences between them.

The Kabyle myth emerged in the 19th century with French colonialism in Algeria (1830–1962), positing that the Kabyle people were more predisposed than Arabs to assimilate into "French civilization."

History 
While elements can be traced to the writings of Abbé Raynal and precolonial travelers, the myth was seriously elaborated by French colonists between 1840 and 1857. The Kabyle myth was diffused between 1860 and 1871, reaching its climax between 1871 and 1892 before finally being abandoned as a basis for social policy in 1915.

The French colony came to consider the Kabyle population more prepared to assimilate into French civilization "by virtue of the supposed democratic nature of their society, their superficial Islamicization, and the higher status of Kabyle women," as well as the belief that they were ancient Christians, of Celtic origin, who could easily be re-Christianized.

Among the proponents of this myth was the French officer , who claimed: "In one hundred years, the Kabyles will be French!" , a colonist theorist of "Berber separatism" and racist, claimed that the qanuns (customary laws) of the Kabyles came from someone who was "not of the family of Mohamed and Moses but of that of Montesquieu and Condorcet."

Eugène Daumas and Paul-Dieudonné Fabar published in 1847: ‘‘Beneath the Muslim peel, one finds a Christian seed. We recognize now that the Kabyle people, partly autochtonous, partly German in origin, previously entirely Christian, did not completely transform itself with its new religion. . . [The Kabyle] re-dressed himself in a burnous, but he kept underneath his anterior social form, and it is not only with his facial tattoos that he displays before us, unbeknownst to him, the symbol of the Cross’’ (Daumas and Fabar 1847: I, 77).

Legacy 
An analogous dichotomy played out in the Berber policy of the French protectorate in Morocco (1912–1956). According to Edmund Burke III, who described it as "one of the most enduring aspects of the French sociology of Islam, the myth and its supposed Arab-Berber dichotomy was fundamental to colonial discourse in North Africa, and its impact shaped postcolonial political discourse as well.

Alfred Rosenbergs 1930 book The Myth of the Twentieth Century, a touchstone of Nazi philosophy, includes the Berbers in with the Nordic Aryans and the upper classes of ancient Egypt as advanced superior races. This presumably is based on Rosenberg's familiarity with the Kabyle myth.

References 

Kabyle people
Propaganda legends
French Algeria